The Yuantaizi Tomb (袁台子墓) is located in Yuantaizi village of the former Shi'ertaiyingzi Township, now part of Liucheng subdistrict, Chaoyang County, Liaoning, China. It was found in 1982, and dates back to the early 5th century, corresponding to the latter part of the Eastern Jin period (317–420). The tomb walls and ceilings are plastered and decorated with murals showing hybrid designs from Han Chinese and Murong Xianbei. Chaoyang, formerly Longcheng, was the capital of the Yan dynasty (AD 337-370) of the Xianbei.

References

Archaeological sites in China
Major National Historical and Cultural Sites in Liaoning
Chaoyang, Liaoning